In June 2014, England played a three test series against New Zealand as part of the 2014 mid-year rugby union tests. They played the All Blacks across the three weeks that the June International window is allocated to; 7 June–21 June, and contested the Hillary Shield, in which England has won once to New Zealand's four. The series was part of the second year of the global rugby calendar established by the International Rugby Board, which runs through to 2019. In addition to the test series, England also played Super Rugby side Crusaders, in a mid-week uncapped match ahead of the third test in Hamilton. They also played the Barbarians at Twickenham, for their annual meeting at the stadium before the tour.

New Zealand won the series 3–0, scoring 84 points to England's 55 over the three test matches.

Fixtures

Squads
Note: Caps and ages are to 7 June, pre first test.

England
On 26 May, Stuart Lancaster named two squads. A 23-man squad for the annual uncapped match against the Barbarians, coached by Jon Callard and Joe Lydon, and a 30-man squad for their test series against New Zealand. This squad did not feature any players from Saracens or Northampton Saints due to the 2013–14 Aviva Premiership final. Following the final, Lancaster named an additional squad to join the team ahead of the second test against New Zealand.

On 27 May, prop Nathan Catt was added to the touring squad to New Zealand due to fitness concerns over other props. Fraser Balmain replaced Catt for the Barbarians match.

On 2 June, Lancaster added an additional 16 players to the touring squad. 15 of which were call-ups, while 1, Kyle Sinckler, was promoted from the England XV side after the Barbarians match.

On 13 June, Michael Paterson was added to the touring squad to cover the second row ahead of the uncapped match against the Crusaders.

 Head coach:  Stuart Lancaster

1 indicates players selected for the 23-man squad for the Barbarians match. 2 indicates players added to the touring squad on 2 June.

New Zealand
New Zealand's 31-man squad for their June 2014 Test series against England.

On 2 June 2014, Matt Todd was added to the squad to provide cover for Sam Cane.

All squad members play rugby in New Zealand.

 Head coach:  Steve Hansen
Note: Caps correct 1 June 2014

Matches

Barbarians

Notes:
 Jon Callard coached England, with Lancaster in New Zealand with the touring 30-man squad.
 This was the Barbarians first back to back win since their back to back wins over England and Wales in 2011, which was the last time the Baa Baas beat England.

First test

Notes:
 Malakai Fekitoa and TJ Perenara made their international debuts for New Zealand.
 Chris Pennell and Joe Gray made their international debuts for England.
 With this win, New Zealand win 31 consecutive home matches, a world record by a test team.

Second test

Notes:
 Jerome Kaino earned his 50th test cap for New Zealand.
 Patrick Tuipulotu made his international debut for New Zealand.
 Kieran Brookes made his international debut for England.
 New Zealand retain the Hillary Shield, the fifth time they have held the trophy.

Crusaders

Third test

Statistics
Key
Con: Conversions
Pen: Penalties
DG: Drop goals
Pts: Points

Tour statistics

Test series statistics

See also
 2014 mid-year rugby union tests
 History of rugby union matches between England and New Zealand

References

England national rugby union team tours of New Zealand
Tour
England tour
Eng